The Yaghnob is a river in Ayni District of Sughd Region, Tajikistan. Together with the Iskander Darya, it forms the Fan Darya, a major left tributary of the Zeravshan.

The source of the Yaghnob is in the Matcha Mountains, where the Zarafshan and the Gissar Ranges merge. The Yaghnob is mainly fed by glaciers and snow fields. The river flows from the east to the west, south of and parallel to the upper Zeravshan River, through the Yaghnob Valley, a remote location populated by the Yaghnobi people speaking the Yaghnobi language. The main village in the valley is Anzob. It joins the east-flowing Iskander Darya to form the Fan Darya which flows north to join the Zeravshan at Ayni. The main road north from Dushanbe follows the lower Yaghnob and the Fan Darya. Before the Soviets blasted a road through, the upper valley was protected by an almost impenetrable gorge, which accounts for the historical isolation of its population.

References
 

Rivers of Tajikistan
Yaghnob